The tournament in Wuhan was a new edition to the ITF Women's Circuit. 

Wang Qiang won the inaugural event, defeating Luksika Kumkhum in the final, 6–2, 6–2.

Seeds

Draw

Finals

Top half

Bottom half

References 
 Main draw

Wuhan - Singles
Wuhan World Tennis Tour